The Volvo TR670 Series was a taxicab manufactured by Volvo between 1930 and 1937. The model name stands for TRafikvagn ("taxicab"), 6 cylinders, 7 seats; the third digit indicates the version.

TR670-674 

With the introduction of the six-cylinder PV650 Series in 1929, Volvo had a car large and robust enough to be competitive on the lucrative taxicab market. The TR670 Series was introduced in February 1930. Volvo increased the wheelbase by 150 mm (to 3,100 mm), which turned the car into a seven seater with two foldable spare seats in the passenger compartment. The car was built in two versions: the TR S (Stad, “town”) had a glass partition between the driver and the passenger seats. This car also had a higher roof line, so that the gentlemen wouldn’t have to take off their top hats during the ride. The TR L (Landsort, “countryside”) lacked the partition and used the same roof line as the ordinary PV651. The model names were soon altered to TR671 and TR672, in line with the PV650/PV651/PV652 nomenclature. As with the PV650 Series, there were also commercial chassis versions of the car.

The cars where succeeded in the spring of 1931 by the TR673 and TR674. These new cars had longer and wider bodies, to increase the passenger space.

In January 1932 the taxicabs were updated with the larger capacity 3,366 cc EB engine and a new 3-speed gearbox with synchronized 2nd and 3rd gear.

Versions 
Production data from Lindh, p. 234.
 TR670: 1930-34, 88 cars built, commercial chassis
 TR671: 1930-31, with glass partition
 TR672: 1930-31, without glass partition
 TR673: 1931-34, 233 cars built, with glass partition
 TR674: 1931-34, 138 cars built, without glass partition

Total production of TR671/672: 200 cars

TR676-679 

In April 1934 the taxicabs were updated with a new, stronger chassis with an X-shaped cross member support, smaller 17-inch rims and an all-steel body, without the wooden frame. The wheelbase was increased another 150 mm, except for the town car which kept the smaller wheelbase and the higher roof line.

Versions 
 TR675: 1934, 2 cars built, commercial chassis on 3,100 mm wheelbase
 TR676: 1934-35, 29 cars built, with glass partition and 3,100 mm wheelbase
 TR677: 1934, 2 cars built, commercial chassis
 TR678: 1934-35, 39 cars built, with glass partition
 TR679: 1934, 114 cars built, without glass partition

TR701-704 

In 1935 Volvo updated the taxicabs once more. The cars got the larger capacity 3670cc EC engine and a V-shaped radiator grille.
The TR670 Series was superseded by the Volvo PV800 Series in 1937.

Versions 
 TR701: 1935-37, 214 cars built, with glass partition and 3,100 mm wheelbase
 TR702: 1935-37, 11 cars built, commercial chassis
 TR703: 1935-37, 181 cars built, with glass partition
 TR704: 1935-37, 530 cars built, without glass partition

References 

Volvo Personvagnar-från 20-tal till 80-tal by Björn-Eric Lindh, 1984.

External links 

Volvo Cars Heritage.
Volvo Museum.
Storvolvoklubben 

TR670 Series
Rear-wheel-drive vehicles
Vehicles introduced in 1930
1930s cars
Taxis of Sweden